Loyalty and Betrayal is the fourth album by hardcore punk band Against, released on the 20 August 2007 by Trial & Error Records.

Track listing
"One Step ahead" (Feat. Nick Jett)
"Don't Pray For Me"
"Not In This Alone"
"In My Head"
"Against The Grain" (Feat. Scott Vogel)
"Loyalty And Betrayal" (Feat. Vinnie Stigma)
"Kill Or Be Killed" (Feat. Roger Miret)
"All For Nothing"
"Life Goes By"
"Left With nothing"
"Where's The Revolution Gone"
Slip Away"

2007 albums
Against (Australian band) albums